Eustace Hall located on Laboratory Row is the only building on Michigan State University's main campus in East Lansing, Michigan that is on the National Register of Historic Places. Designed in a mix of "Queen Anne massing, Richardsonian Romanesque features, and Shingle Style", it was built in 1888 as the Horticultural Laboratory Building. 
Its design has been variously attributed to noted MSU alumnus and noted horticulturist Liberty Hyde Bailey and to Lansing architect William Appleyard
It housed the horticulture department until 1924 when a  new horticulture building (now known as Old Horticulture) was opened. It then became the University College Building until 1961 when it was renamed for Harry J. Eustace who chaired the Horticulture Department from 1908 to 1918.

The third-oldest extant building on the MSU campus, it was listed on the Michigan Register of Historic Places on March 3, 1971 as the Horticultural Laboratory Building  and was listed on the National Register on September 3, 1971 as Eustace Hall.

In 1999, Eustace Hall underwent a $3 million renovation funded in part by a major donation from MSU alumni Jeffrey N. Cole (BS, 1970) and Kathryn C. Cole (MBA, 1990) of Birmingham, Michigan and was renamed Eustace-Cole Hall in their honor. Eustace-Cole Hall now serves as the headquarters of the MSU Honors College.

See also
 List of Michigan State Historic Sites in Ingham County, Michigan

References

External links
 Eustace-Cole Hall on flickr

National Register of Historic Places in Ingham County, Michigan
Michigan State Historic Sites in Ingham County
Queen Anne architecture in Michigan
Richardsonian Romanesque architecture in Michigan
Shingle Style architecture in Michigan